Mikael Seppälä (born March 8, 1994) is a Finnish professional ice hockey defenseman currently playing for Tappara in the Finnish Liiga.

Playing career
Seppälä made his Liiga debut playing with KalPa during the 2013–14 Liiga season.

In 2015 he was playing for and was the captain of Hokki of the Finnish Mestis. Seppälä transferred back to KalPa in the end of 2016, leaving the captain position in Hokki in the middle of the season. He signed a contract extension with KalPa in 2019.

Career statistics

International

Awards and honours

References

External links

1994 births
Living people
KalPa players
Hokki players
Finnish ice hockey defencemen
People from Ylivieska
Sportspeople from North Ostrobothnia
Tappara players